The Higg Index is an apparel and footwear industry self-assessment standard to rate environmental and social sustainability throughout the supply chain. It was launched in 2012 by the Sustainable Apparel Coalition (SAC), a nonprofit organization of more than 270 fashion brands/retailers, manufacturers, academic institutions, affiliates, NGOs and governments.

Today, more than 21,000 organizations around the world are using the Higg Index, and its global reach and variety ensure that the SAC can now catalyze change from within the industry. However, the Higg Index has been criticized by some for using poor data and a non-transparent approach resulting in potentially misleading information on which fiber is more sustainable.

Overview

The Sustainable Apparel Coalition developed the Higg Index. Founded in 2011, it is a nonprofit organization whose members include brands producing apparel or footwear; retailers; industry affiliates and trade associations; the U.S. Environmental Protection Agency, academic institutions and environmental nonprofits.

The Higg Index provides a suite of five tools for the apparel industry and footwear industry to assess sustainability throughout a product's entire life cycle, from materials to end-of-life. The metrics created Higg Index are limited to a company's internal use for the evaluation and improvement of environmental performance. As of 2012, plans for a future version included a scoring scale to communicate a product's sustainability to consumers and other stakeholders.

History
The Higg Index was adapted from two previously existing sustainability measurement standards: the Nike Apparel Environmental Design Tool and the 2007 Eco Index created by the Outdoor Industry Association, the European Outdoor Group and the Zero Waste Alliance. The Eco Index had been created by a group of outdoor companies including REI, MEC, Patagonia, Outdoor Research and others starting in 2007. Leaders of the group at this time included Kevin Myette, Greg Scott, Ammi Borenstein, Peter Girard, Nick Sterling and many others. After 2-3 years of independent work the Eco Index was adopted by the Outdoor Industry Association and ultimately became a core component of the Higg Index.
The SAC was established as brands and retailers sought to self-regulate on environmental and sustainability issues.
Version 1.0 of the Higg Index was made public in July 2012.

According to the Coalition's Executive Director in 2012, the name "Higg" was inspired by the Higgs Boson search. The name Higg also met other key criteria: it was short, easy to pronounce and was able to clear trademark registration in 120 countries.

In its first iteration, Higg Index metrics focus on environmental factors in the apparel supply chain. As of 2013, Metrics pertaining to footwear as well as labor and social sustainability were planned for a future release. On 11 December 2013, an updated version of the Higg Index was released.

In October 2015, the Sustainable Apparel Coalition announced the launch of the Social Labor and Convergence Project, which seeks to establish a uniform standard for auditing labor conditions and social impact in the apparel and footwear industries.

Criticism
The Higg Index has been criticized for being based on poor data and using a non-transparent approach resulting in misleading information which fiber is more sustainable. The index is rating synthetics as the most sustainable choice. 

In June 2022, the Norwegian Consumer Authority notified the Sustainable Apparel Coalition, H&M and Norrøna that they concluded the consumer-facing part of the SAC's transparency program was potentially misleading to consumers. June 27, 2022 the Sustainable Apparel Coalition said that it will pause the use of consumer-facing Higg MSI labels globally.

Since the initial outreach from the NCA, and following the publication of a guidance document, the SAC stated it was "grateful for the collaboration and productive discussions" and that it was working through the non legally binding guidance. A representative from the NCA also took part in the SAC's 2022 Annual Meeting in Singapore, as panelists discussed the challenges and opportunities of eco-labelling. The theme of the event was Collective Action on Common Ground.

References

External links
Sustainable Apparel Coalition
Higg Index apparel coalition
Nike Environmental Design Tool
The Eco IndexOutdoor Industry Association 
Sustainability Working GroupOutdoor Industry Association 
The European Outdoor Group
Zero Waste Alliance

Fashion
Clothing and the environment
Sustainability metrics and indices
Environmental indices
Textile organizations